Acrobasis curvella is a species of snout moth in the genus Acrobasis. It was described by Émile Louis Ragonot in 1893. It is found in Amur, Russia.

References

Moths described in 1893
Acrobasis
Moths of Asia